SK Brann Kvinner (previously known as IL Sandviken Kvinner) is the women's football branch of SK Brann. Based in Sandviken, Bergen, the team plays in Norway's top league, Toppserien.

History
SK Brann Kvinner used to be part of IL Sandviken. Sandviken's women's team won the Toppserien in 2021, and the Norwegian Women's Cup in 1995. The team was renamed SK Brann Kvinner ahead of the 2022 season. In their first season, Brann were crowned champions of both the 2022 Toppserien and the 2022 Norwegian Women's Cup.

Current squad

Out on loan

Former players

Current coaching staff

Honours
Toppserien
Winners (2): 2021, 2022
Runners-up (1): 1996

Norwegian Cup
Winners (2): 1995, 2022
Runners-up (3): 1991, 2018, 2021

Recent seasons 
{|class="wikitable"
|-bgcolor="#efefef"
! Season
! 
! Pos.
! Pl.
! W
! D
! L
! GS
! GA
! P
!Cup
!Notes
|-
|2004
|TS
|align=right |7
|align=right|18||align=right|4||align=right|6||align=right|8
|align=right|23||align=right|44||align=right|18
|3rd round
|
|-
|2005
|TS
|align=right |8
|align=right|18||align=right|4||align=right|3||align=right|11
|align=right|25||align=right|58||align=right|15
|3rd round
|
|-
|2006
|TS
|align=right |8
|align=right|18||align=right|4||align=right|1||align=right|13
|align=right|25||align=right|63||align=right|13
|3rd round
|
|-
|2007
|TS
|align=right bgcolor="#FFCCCC"| 11
|align=right|22||align=right|2||align=right|3||align=right|17
|align=right|16||align=right|76||align=right|9
|3rd round
|Relegated
|-
|2008
|D1
|align=right bgcolor=#DDFFDD| 1
|align=right|18||align=right|15||align=right|2||align=right|1
|align=right|63||align=right|13||align=right|47
|3rd round
|Promoted
|-
|2009
|TS
|align=right bgcolor="#FFCCCC"| 11
|align=right|22||align=right|3||align=right|2||align=right|17
|align=right|20||align=right|72||align=right|11
|3rd round
|Relegated
|-
|2010
|D1
|align=right bgcolor=#DDFFDD| 1
|align=right|22||align=right|16||align=right|5||align=right|1
|align=right|69||align=right|24||align=right|53
|3rd round
|Promoted
|-
|2011 
|TS
|align=right |10
|align=right|22||align=right|5||align=right|4||align=right|13
|align=right|24||align=right|51||align=right|19
|3rd round
|
|-
|2012 
|TS
|align=right |6
|align=right|22||align=right|9||align=right|2||align=right|11
|align=right|45||align=right|51||align=right|29
|Quarter-finals
|
|-
|2013 
|TS
|align=right bgcolor="#FFCCCC"| 12
|align=right|22||align=right|3||align=right|1||align=right|18
|align=right|19||align=right|56||align=right|10
|3rd round
|Relegated
|-
|2014
|D1
|align=right bgcolor=#DDFFDD| 1
|align=right|22||align=right|21||align=right|1||align=right|0
|align=right|90||align=right|10||align=right|64
|3rd round
|Promoted
|-
|2015 
|TS
|align=right |9
|align=right|22||align=right|5||align=right|6||align=right|11
|align=right|23||align=right|36||align=right|21
|Quarter-finals
|
|-
|2016 
|TS
|align=right |6
|align=right|22||align=right|7||align=right|6||align=right|9
|align=right|29||align=right|28||align=right|27
|Quarter-finals 
|
|-
|2017 
|TS
|align=right |9
|align=right|22||align=right|4||align=right|6||align=right|12
|align=right|23||align=right|34||align=right|18
|3rd round
|
|-
|2018 
|TS
|align=right |4
|align=right|22||align=right|11||align=right|6||align=right|5
|align=right|42||align=right|29||align=right|39
|bgcolor=silver|Runners-up
|
|-
|2019 
|TS
|align=right |4
|align=right|22||align=right|12||align=right|4||align=right|6
|align=right|43||align=right|32||align=right|40
||Quarter-finals
|
|-
|2020
|TS
|align=right |4
|align=right|18||align=right|9||align=right|3||align=right|6
|align=right|29||align=right|23||align=right|30
||Semi-finals
|
|-
|2021
|TS
|align=right bgcolor=gold| 1
|align=right|18||align=right|17||align=right|1||align=right|0
|align=right|50||align=right|6||align=right|52
|bgcolor=silver|Runners-up
|
|-
|rowspan=2|2022
|rowspan=2|TS
|rowspan=2 align=right bgcolor=gold| 1
|align=right|18||align=right|14||align=right|3||align=right|1
|align=right|53||align=right|13||align=right|45
|rowspan=2 bgcolor=gold|Winners
|rowspan=2|
|-
|align=right|6||align=right|4||align=right|2||align=right|0
|align=right|10||align=right|4||align=right|20
|}
Source:

References

Women
Women's football clubs in Norway
Sport in Bergen